Bruce Abdoulaye (born April 15, 1982), is a football coach and former player. He is currently in charge of US Torcy's U19 team. Born in France, he represented Congo at international level.

Club career 
Abdoulaye spent most of his playing career in the French Ligue 1 and 2. He signed for Clermont Foot in 2006 and played in 114 competitive games.

In the summer of 2012, Abdoulaye joined Azerbaijan Premier League side Inter Baku. Abdoulaye rejected a new contract from Inter Baku in June 2014, returning to France to sign with US Orléans.

Abdoulaye is a dominant right back, known for his ruthless approach and rash tackling. In the recent game in the Europa League against IFK Mariehamn Abdoulaye was responsible for severely injuring two opposing players.

International career 
Abdoulaye made his debut for the Republic of the Congo in 2006.

Coaching & management career 
While playing for Grenoble Foot 38 in 2015 and 2016, Abdoulaye also coached the club's U19 squad. In the summer 2017, he was appointed manager and sporting director of Louhans-Cuiseaux FC.

On 2 August 2018, Abdoulaye was appointed manager of FC Villefranche's B-team in the Regional 2. However, a few days later, the club confirmed that he had left the club again. At the end of the same month, he joined Bourg Sud as responsible for the technical area and U13 manager. In January 2019, Abdoulaye also launched a new academy, Pôle Performance Academy, for both girls and boys between 9 and 17 years old, for individual and collective improvement courses.

In May 2019 Abdoulaye announced he was the new manager of the Central African Republic national team, a claim which was denied by the country's football association. Later on the month, it was confirmed that he had been appointed manager for the Central African Republic national team. He left the position in September 2019, when François Zahoui was hired as the new manager.

On 18 May 2020, he was appointed manager of Regional 2 side Tarbes Pyrénées. However, he left the position in September 2020 after accepting an offer from Umm Salal SC, where he was presented as the clubs new manager. In the summer 2021, he took charge of US Torcy's U19s.

Career statistics

International goals
Scores and results list Congo's tally first.

References

External links 

 
 
 Futbolmercado
 

1982 births
Living people
People from Château-Thierry
Footballers from Hauts-de-France
Sportspeople from Aisne 
French footballers
Republic of the Congo footballers
Republic of the Congo international footballers
French sportspeople of Republic of the Congo descent
Ligue 2 players
US Sénart-Moissy players
FC Lausanne-Sport players
Grenoble Foot 38 players
Clermont Foot players
FC Metz players
US Orléans players
Football Bourg-en-Bresse Péronnas 01 players
Association football defenders
Black French sportspeople
French expatriate sportspeople in Switzerland
Expatriate footballers in Switzerland
Expatriate footballers in Azerbaijan 
French expatriate sportspeople in Azerbaijan
French expatriate footballers
French football managers
French expatriate sportspeople in the Central African Republic
French expatriate football managers
Expatriate football managers in the Central African Republic
Central African Republic national football team managers
Republic of the Congo expatriate sportspeople in Switzerland 
Republic of the Congo expatriate sportspeople in Azerbaijan
Republic of the Congo expatriate sportspeople in Qatar
Republic of the Congo expatriate footballers
Republic of the Congo football managers
Republic of the Congo expatriate sportspeople in the Central African Republic
Republic of the Congo expatriate football managers